Rajasekhar (died 1991), often credited as Rajasekhar B.Sc., was an Indian film director and producer of Kollywood during the 1980s. He also directed films in Telugu, Kannada and Hindi.

Career 
Rajasekhar was born in Nattarasankottai in then Ramanathapuram district and was a Bachelor of Science graduate. He made his debut as director with the 1980 Kannada movie Hunnimeya Rathriyalli.He was a director of 1980s and his major works were with Rajnikanth and Kamal Haasan. Almost all of Rajnikanth's mid to late 80s films like Thambikku Entha Ooru, Padikkadavan, Maapillai and Dharma Dorai were directed by Rajasekhar. He was also the director of Kamal Haasan movies Vikram, the first Tamil film which crossed the budget of 1 crore and Kakki Chattai. He also directed Malaiyoor Mambattiyan  and Maaveeran. He also directed Vijaykanth movie Eetti and Cooliekkaran.

Filmography

Death 
Rajasekhar died in 1991 in a car accident, shortly after the release off his last film Dharma Durai.

References

External links 

Telugu film directors
Tamil-language film directors
Year of birth missing
Hindi-language film directors
20th-century Indian film directors